This is a list of seasons played by Sheffield Wednesday Football Club in English and European football, from 1877 (when The Wednesday first entered the Sheffield Challenge Cup) to the present day. It details the club's achievements in major competitions, the top scorers in all competitions, and the average home league attendance for each season.

Seasons

Key

Pld – Matches played
W – Matches won
D – Matches drawn
L – Matches lost
GF – Goals for
GA – Goals against
Pts – Points
Pos – Final position

Prem – Premier League
Champ – EFL Championship
Lge 1 – EFL League One
Div 1 – Football League First Division
Div 2 – Football League Second Division
Div 3 – Football League Third Division
Alliance – Football Alliance
n/a – Not applicable

GS – Group stage
R1 – First round
R2 – Second round
R3 – Third round
R4 – Fourth round
R5 – Fifth round
QF – Quarter-finals
SF – Semi-finals
F – Regional finals
RU – Runners-up
W – Winners
(N) – Northern section of regionalised stage

Footnotes

References
General

Specific

Seasons
 
English football club seasons